Christopher A. Shelling (born November 3, 1972) is a former American professional football player who was a defensive back and linebacker in the National Football League (NFL), the World League of American Football (WLAF), the Canadian Football League (CFL), and the XFL. He played for the Cincinnati Bengals and Atlanta Falcons of the NFL, the Rhein Fire of the WLAF, the Hamilton Tiger-Cats of the CFL, and the Birmingham Thunderbolts of the XFL. Shelling played collegiately at Auburn University, where he was an All-American.

References

1972 births
Living people
American football defensive backs
American players of Canadian football
Atlanta Falcons players
Auburn Tigers football players
Birmingham Thunderbolts players
Canadian football defensive backs
Canadian football linebackers
Cincinnati Bengals players
Hamilton Tiger-Cats players
Players of American football from Columbus, Georgia
Rhein Fire players